Jorge Insunza Becker (21 April 1936 – 17 March 2019) was a Chilean communist politician who served as member of the Chamber of Deputies of Chile between 1969 until 1973, after which the Chamber was dissolved (following the 1973 coup d'état) and he went into exile.

He was responsible for the propaganda of the Salvador Allende Command, Popular Unity candidate, in the 1970 presidential election.

References

1936 births
2019 deaths
People from Villarrica
Chilean people of Basque descent
Communist Party of Chile politicians
Deputies of the XLVI Legislative Period of the National Congress of Chile
Deputies of the XLVII Legislative Period of the National Congress of Chile
20th-century Chilean engineers
Instituto Nacional General José Miguel Carrera alumni
University of Chile alumni
Chilean exiles